Sir John Robert Bennett KBE (August 8, 1866 – October 23, 1941) was a merchant and politician in Newfoundland. He represented St. John's West from 1904 to 1923, and Harbour Grace from 1924 to 1928 in the Newfoundland House of Assembly.

Biography 
The son of Edward W. Bennett and Amelia Goff, he was born in St. John's and was educated at the Church of England Academy.

Bennett began work with C. F. Bennett & Company in 1881 as a clerk. He later joined his brother's brewing business, later becoming president and managing director. From 1902 to 1906, he served on the St. John's municipal council. He served in the Newfoundland cabinet as Colonial Secretary from 1913 to 1917, and from 1924 to 1928. From 1917 until the end of World War I, Bennett served as Minister of Militia. He organized the Liberal-Progressive Party in 1923 but was defeated when he ran for reelection that year. Bennett was elected to the assembly again in 1924, this time for Harbour Grace.

Bennett was named a Knight Commander of the Order of the British Empire in 1926; also in 1926, he was named District Grand Master of English Freemasonry in Newfoundland.

He was married twice, first to Laura Taylor in 1891 and then to Beatrice Shannon Greaves in 1936.

He died in St. John's on October 23, 1941.

References

External links 
 

1866 births
1941 deaths
Newfoundland People's Party MHAs
Knights Commander of the Order of the British Empire
Government ministers of the Dominion of Newfoundland
Colonial Secretaries of Newfoundland